Mustang is the ninth album by Detroit rock band Electric Six. It was released on October 8, 2013.

Track listing

Personnel
 Dick Valentine - vocals
  - lead guitar
 Da Ve - rhythm guitar
 Tait Nucleus? - keyboards
 Smorgasboard - bass
 Percussion World - drums
 Carrie Acosta - background vocals
 Meaghan Degrave - background vocals
 Eva Droege - background vocals
 Natalie Fedirko - background vocals
 Emma Guzman - background vocals
 Kendy Loewen - background vocals
 Melody Malosh - background vocals
 Annalisa Pavone - background vocals
 Bradley Stern - saxophone
 Jason Pearce - congas

Legacy
 The band performed "Show Me What Your Lights Mean" in their live concert movie "Absolute Treasure".
 Dick Valentine recorded acoustic versions of "Show Me What Your Lights Mean" and "Iron Dragon" for inclusion on his solo album "Quiet Time".
 The band performed "Adam Levine" and "The New Shampoo" on their second live album "You're Welcome!".
 The band performed a stripped-down version of "Show Me What Your Lights Mean" on their third live album Chill Out!.

References

External links
 https://www.amazon.com/Mustang-Electric-Six/dp/B00EJMQYYQ

2013 albums
Electric Six albums
Metropolis Records albums